Steam Tug Wattle is a steam-powered tugboat undergoing refurbishment in Melbourne, Australia.

The tugboat was constructed at Cockatoo Island Dockyard during the Great Depression as a project to keep shipyard apprentices employed. The tugboat was built with a riveted steel hull, but welding was used on the bulkheads and fuel bunkers for the first time in an Australian shipyard. The vessel was the first Australian tugboat to be built with an oil-fired compound steam engine.

On completion in 1933, the tugboat was offered to the Royal Australian Navy (RAN). Named Wattle and operated by a civilian crew, the vessel was primarily used for warship towing and manoeuvring, and was also employed as a target tower.

The RAN marked the tugboat for disposal in 1969, and she was purchased by a Sydney-based syndicate, who operated the vessel on tourist cruises around and outside Sydney Harbour. The syndicate kept Wattle operational until 1977, then sold the ship to a Melbourne-based company, who towed Wattle to Port Phillip in 1979. The tugboat continued to be used for tourist cruises around the bay until 2003, when it failed survey and had to be withdrawn from service.

Wattle was initially moored at Victoria Dock while money was raised to refurbish the ship, then was relocated to Victoria Harbour during the Docklands redevelopment. In 2007, the Sorrento Steam organisation and the Bay Steamers Maritime Museum joined the project: the former using the restoration of Wattle as a stepping stone towards their own plans to restore steam trams in Sorrento. In 2009, the tugboat was removed from the water and placed on blocks in a temporary shipyard in the Docklands precinct. The intention is to bring the vessel back to survey standard and resume passenger operations.

Wattle was listed by the National Trust as being of national historic significance on 16 June 1993. According to the National Trust, Wattle is the only surviving small harbour steam tug in Australia, and one of only twenty-two worldwide. It is also one of only eight Australian-built steam-powered ships of any kind remaining. In addition to multiple 'firsts' in construction, the vessel serves as an important example of Depression-era shipbuilding and the transition of technology occurring at this time.

In popular culture

The vessel was used in the highly popular and long-running 1970s and 1980s Channel 10 television serial Prisoner. Prisoner details the lives, struggles and plots of the prisoners and guards ('Screws') in Wentworth detention centre, a high-security women's prison in Melbourne, Victoria, Australia.

The Wattle, with name proudly displayed on a donut life preserver, was in episodes 641 to 643. The plot line was that trainee officers had arranged for work release for four prisoners at a time, under the captain's instructions and guarded by a senior officer. The idea was to learn ship-maintaining skills and get 'fresh air and sunshine'.

The leader of the female prisoners, 'Top Dog' Rita Collins, plans to use the temporary freedom to kill her rival, a guard called Ferguson, or the Freak. In episode 642 the ship has its inlet valve sabotaged by Rita, who is familiar with all engines and drifts for a time.

There are numerous excellent film shots of the ship – looking as it was at the time in its role as a day cruiser. One particular segment set to music is of value to researching its appearance circa 1985.

References

External links
S.T."Wattle" Home Page

Steam tugs
1933 ships
Tugboats of Australia
Ships built in New South Wales
Museum ships in Australia